Dogtooth (Kynodontas) is a 2009 Greek psychological drama film directed by Yorgos Lanthimos. Written by Lanthimos and Efthymis Filippou, the film is about a husband and wife (Christos Stergioglou and Michelle Valley) who keep their children (Angeliki Papoulia, Mary Tsoni and Christos Passalis) ignorant of the world outside their property well into adulthood.

Dogtooth is Lanthimos's second feature film. It won the Prix Un Certain Regard at the 2009 Cannes Film Festival and was nominated for Best Foreign Language Film at the 83rd Academy Awards.

Plot
A couple live in a fenced-in compound with their adult son and two adult daughters. The children have no knowledge of the outside world; their parents say they will be ready to leave once they lose a dogtooth, and that one can only leave safely by car. The children entertain themselves with endurance games, such as keeping a finger in hot water. They believe they have a brother on the other side of the fence to whom they throw supplies or stones. The parents reward good behavior with stickers and punish bad behavior with violence.

The father pays a security guard at his factory, Christina, to come to the house and have sex with his son. Frustrated by the boy's refusal to give her cunnilingus, Christina trades her headband with the elder daughter in exchange for oral sex from her. The elder daughter persuades the younger daughter to lick her shoulder by bartering the headband. Later, the younger daughter volunteers to lick the elder again. The elder has nothing to offer in exchange, but the younger does not mind and experiments by licking other body parts.

The father visits a dog-training facility and demands to have his dog returned. The trainer refuses because the dog has not finished its training, and asks: "Do we want an animal or a friend?"

When the children are terrified by a stray cat in the garden, the son kills it with a pair of pruning shears. Deciding to take advantage of the incident, the father shreds his clothes, covers himself in fake blood, and tells his children that their unseen brother was killed by a cat, the most dangerous creature. After he teaches them to bark on all fours to fend off cats, the family holds a memorial service for the brother.

Christina again barters for oral sex from the elder daughter. The daughter rejects her offer of hair gel and demands the Hollywood videotapes in her bag. She watches the films in secret and afterward recreates scenes and quotes their dialogue. When the father discovers the tapes, he beats her with one of them, then goes to Christina's flat and hits her with her VCR, cursing her future children to be corrupted by "bad influences".

The parents decide that, with Christina no longer available, they will have their son choose one of his sisters as a new sexual partner. After fondling both sisters with his eyes closed, he chooses the elder. She is uncomfortable during their sex and afterward recites threatening dialogue from a Hollywood film to her brother.

During a dance performance for the parents' wedding anniversary, the younger daughter stops to rest, but the elder continues, performing the choreography from the film Flashdance, disturbing her parents. That night, she knocks out one of her dogteeth with a dumbbell and hides in the boot of her father's car. The father discovers her tooth fragments and searches for her fruitlessly. He drives to work the next day; the car sits outside the factory, unattended.

Cast
 Christos Stergioglou as father
 Michelle Valley as mother
 Angeliki Papoulia as older daughter
 Mary Tsoni as younger daughter
 Christos Passalis as son
 Anna Kalaitzidou as Christina

Production
Dogtooth was the feature film début for Boo Productions, an Athens-based advertising company. The Greek Film Center supported the project with about €200,000 and much of the production was done with help from volunteers. Another €50,000 was offered by the production studio, bringing the overall budget to €250,000. Anna Kalaitzidou and Christos Passalis were stage actors who were cast after having worked with Lanthimos earlier. Mary Tsoni was not a professional actress, but a singer in a punk band. Lanthimos had an open approach to both acting and visual style and felt it would look fake if he involved himself too much in the details. Only when rehearsals started did he begin to develop an idea of the style in which the film should be shot: one where he tried to combine a realistic environment with "really strict framing and a cool, surreal look to go with the narrative".

Release
Dogtooth premiered on 18 May 2009 at the Cannes Film Festival, and went on to screen at festivals such as Toronto and Maryland. It was released in Greece on 11 November 2009 through Feelgood Entertainment. Verve Pictures picked up the British distribution rights and launched it on 23 April 2010. The American premiere was on 25 June 2010, managed by Kino International.

Reception
Greek critic Dimitris Danikas gave Dogtooth a rating of eight out of ten ("with enthusiasm"), calling it "black, surreal, nightmarish" and writing that Dogtooth is as important for Greek cinema as Theodoros Angelopoulos's 1970 film Reconstitution. Danikas added, "Lanthimos composes and goes from one level to another like a wildcat-creator, constantly and continuously maintaining the same rigorous style. Hence the aphasia; hence the uniformity; hence the submission and the scheduled mass culture; hence also the serial killer; hence, however, the disobedience, the anarchy. As I said at the beginning: Dogtooth has the surrealism of Buñuel, the scalpel of Haneke, the underground horror of a thriller without the splatter. Perfect." Danikas characterized Dogtooth's Academy Award nomination as "the greatest Greek triumph of recent years." Columnist Dimitris Bouras, writing for Kathimerini, mentioned "the beneficial effects that the prestigious award could have" and wrote that the nomination reveals three interesting facts: "1) in Greece we need to be extroverts (and not only in cinema), 2) exportable product is whatever has an identity, 3) Dogtooths nomination is like an investment – manna from the heaven of Hollywood for the developing Greek cinema."

International
, the film had a 93% approval rating from critics at Rotten Tomatoes, based on 68 reviews with an average rating of 7.70/10. The site's consensus reads: "It'll be too disturbing – and meandering – for some, but Dogtooth is as disturbing and startlingly original as modern filmmaking gets". On Metacritic, the film has a weighted average score of 73 out of 100, based on 17 critics, indicating "generally favorable reviews".

The Scotsmans Alistair Harkness hailed Lanthimos as "a bold new voice on the world cinema scene, someone who might soon be elevated to a similar position as those twin pillars of Euro provocation: Lars von Trier and Michael Haneke", but added that the film is "not... designed simply to shock in the way von Trier's work often does,... nor does it have that annoyingly prescriptive, punitive air of superiority favoured by Haneke's films."

Peter Bradshaw of The Guardian praised the filmmakers' technique, finding Dogtooth "superbly shot, with some deadpan, elegant compositions, and intentionally skewiff framings". Roger Ebert (Chicago Sun-Times) gave the film three out of four stars. He noted the director's "complete command of visuals and performances. His cinematography is like a series of family photographs of a family with something wrong with it. His dialogue sounds composed entirely of sentences memorized from tourist phrase books." Mark Olsen of the Los Angeles Times wrote, "All of the film's purposeful weirdness is conveyed with an unaffected simplicity that recalls the dead-aim haphazard compositions of photographer William Eggleston." He concluded, "as a film, it's pure and singular, but it's not quite fully formed enough to be what one could call truly visionary."

A. O. Scott of The New York Times wrote that the film "at times seems as much an exercise in perversity as an examination of it" and "The static wide-screen compositions are beautiful and strange, with the heads and limbs of the characters frequently cropped. The light is gauzy and diffuse, helping to produce an atmosphere that is insistently and not always unpleasantly dreamlike. You might think of paintings by Balthus or maybe Alex Katz, though the implied stories in those pictures are more genuinely evocative and haunting than the actual narrative of Dogtooth."

Several reviewers, such as Harkness and Bradshaw, made comparisons to the 2008 Fritzl case, although they noted that the screenplay was written before the case emerged. Scott, like Ebert, made references to homeschooling. Resemblances have been noted to the 1972 Mexican film The Castle of Purity.

The film's larger meaning eluded easy expression. Scott called the film "a conversation piece. Though the conversation may... be more along the lines of: 'What was that?' 'I don't know. Weird.' 'Yeah.' [shudder]. 'Weird.'" Olsen saw Dogtooths substance as "part enigma, part allegory and even part sci-fi in its creation of a completely alternate reality." While Ebert found a "message...: God help children whose parents insanely demand unquestioning obedience to their deranged standards.... [S]ome have even described the film as a comedy. I wasn't laughing." For Bradshaw, the film investigates "the essential strangeness of something society insists is the benchmark of normality: the family, a walled city state with its own autocratic rule and untellable secrets." Harkness noted the "absolute mockery the situation makes of the perfect family ideal" where "Lanthimos isn't interested in making specific political or social points and he refuses to offer any clarifying backstory"; he found Dogtooths oddness "as organic and playful as its impact is incisor sharp."

Filmmaker David Lynch called Dogtooth "a fantastic comedy" in a 2012 interview.

Accolades
Greek Prime Minister George Papandreou ended the Cabinet meeting on 25 January 2011 by saying, "The news that the film Dogtooth by Yorgos Lanthimos is nominated for Best Foreign Language Film goes far beyond the world of cinema, arts and culture. It concerns the whole country, its people, the new generation of artists who follow the motto 'Yes, we can do it' during difficult times." He continued, "I won't say that the news shows that miracles happen, because the success of Yorgos Lanthimos is based on hard work, talent and his endless potential. Features that characterize the creative forces which lead Greece to a new era; forces which deserve our support and they will have it. Bravo Yorgos."

The Greek Film Committee unanimously chose Dogtooth to represent Greece at the Oscars.

Potential influences
In 1970, Arturo Ripstein made a very similar film, The Castle of Purity, in which a man keeps his family isolated, the brother and sister have an unusually close connection, and the sister is the one to break the impasse with the outside world. According to Ripstein, his film was based on a case that appeared in newspapers in the 1950s of a man who isolated his family and did not allow them to leave. "There was a lot of talk about the case when I was a little boy." Two works came from that case; a novel by Luis Spota, La Carcajadas del Gato, and a play by Sergio Galindo, "Los Motivos del Lobos".

Actress Dolores del Río was interested in the rights to the play and contacted Luis Buñuel, who declined, but recommended his protege, Ripstein. "Dolores del Río called and said, 'I would like to make an adaptation of the play', and I said, 'I would prefer to go directly to the source and take the case from the newspapers'."

See also
 List of Greek submissions for the Academy Award for Best Foreign Language Film
 List of submissions to the 83rd Academy Awards for Best Foreign Language Film

References

External links
 
 
 
 
 
 

2009 films
2009 drama films
2009 independent films
2009 LGBT-related films
Greek drama films
Greek LGBT-related films
Films set in Greece
Films shot in Athens
2000s Greek-language films
Films directed by Yorgos Lanthimos
Films about dysfunctional families
Films shot in Greece
Films about child abuse
Incest in film
Lesbian-related films
2000s psychological drama films